AWAC may refer to:
Airborne early warning and control, an airborne radar system designed to detect aircraft
Air Wisconsin Airlines Corporation, a regional airline in the United States of America
Alcoa World Alumina and Chemicals, a mining company